This is a list of fictional characters in the television series Harper's Island.

Main characters

Abby Mills

(Portrayed by Elaine Cassidy)
Abby Mills is Henry Dunn's best friend. She left the island seven years ago when her father, Sheriff Mills, sent her away after her mother was killed by John Wakefield, a scene she had witnessed. When she is back on the island, she attempts to reconcile with her father and her former boyfriend Jimmy. She usually hangs out with the groomsmen. Abby never wanted to return to the island after her father sent her away after the 2001 massacre, but still does so because of Henry and Trish's wedding. She is also good friends with Trish, especially after she helps her cope after her father's death. She is smart, strong, and brave, determined to protect her friends and stop Wakefield and finish the job that her father did not finish. She's initially suspected to be Wakefield's child based on an entry in his prison diary. That, along with the thought that the Sheriff is responsible for the murder and J.D.'s last words that it's all about her, causes others to partly blame her, until Madison tells the truth that the Sheriff is not the killer. It's eventually revealed that Henry is her half-brother, and is Wakefield's son and is working with his father to commit the murders. After Shea and Madison escape, Henry turns on Wakefield and kidnaps Abby and Jimmy, planning to frame Jimmy as Wakefield's accomplice and create his childhood fantasy life with Abby. She manages to engineer their escape by pretending to give in and slipping Jimmy a lock pick through a kiss before turning on Henry, and stabs Henry through the chest protecting herself and Jimmy. Henry's last words to Abby were that he loved her.

SURVIVAL – Abby, along with Jimmy, gets rescued by coast guards and taken to the mainland.
KILLS – Henry Dunn.
Appearances: Episodes 1–13

Henry James Dunn
(Portrayed by Christopher Gorham)
 He's Abby's long-time best friend. His parents' deaths several years earlier left Uncle Marty and J.D. as his only living relatives. In the second to last episode, he's revealed to be Wakefield's son, protégé (he was responsible for numerous deaths in Seattle, as practice), and accomplice, and Abby's half-brother. His motive is revealed to be his obsession with Abby; he loves her in his own twisted way, and is killing everyone around them in order to create a childhood fantasy life with her as he remembers Abby's wish that they could stay on the island forever, just the two of them.
For most of the first part of the series, Henry deals with several problems such as proving himself to Trish's disapproving father, dealing with his suspicions about Hunter, and helping his friends do something about the blooded money they found. Henry acts as the survivors' unofficial leader, but has, in actuality, orchestrated the whole situation with his father and committed some of the murders. He turns on his father to protect Abby then kidnaps her and Jimmy and fakes their three deaths, planning to force Jimmy to sign a confession so Abby and he can live alone together on the island. Despite her reaction to his confession and previous escape attempt, he believes she shares his dream and takes her to say goodbye to Jimmy, which she does in order to slip Jimmy a lock pick. He lashes out at her when she rejects him, but Jimmy, who managed to free himself, tackles him off a cliff to protect Abby.
DEATH – In Episode 13, Henry comes up behind Abby when she is kneeling next to Jimmy at the bottom of the cliff, and she stabs him with the boarding knife out of protection and surprise. Henry's dying words were, "Abby... I love you."
KILLS – Ben Wellington, Reverend Fain, Hunter Jennings, Thomas Wellington, Richard Allen, Malcolm Ross, J.D. Dunn, Katherine Wellington, Trish Wellington, Christopher "Sully" Sullivan, John Wakefield.
Appearances: Episodes 1–13

Killed by Abby Mills.

Patricia "Trish" Wellington
(Portrayed by Katie Cassidy)
Trish Wellington is Henry's bride-to-be. She loves Henry and wants to marry him but her father disapproves of Henry. The Wellingtons are wealthy, so Trish's perfect wedding comes in the form of a grand week-long stay on Harper's Island, full of activities, food and fun for her family and friends. Trish loves her father and sister very much, as well as Henry, unlike her father. Trish is consistently pursued by her ex-lover Hunter (with the help of her father), but she shuns him away. Henry even sets a test by sending a fake rendezvous to Trish from "Hunter" but he sighs with witnesses Trish back out from the meeting. When J.D. became the primary suspect of Mr. Wellington's murder, Trish contemplates on not going through with her wedding, but when J.D. was proven innocent, she eventually realizes that she loves Henry and wants to spend her life with him forever. Trish experienced several threats to her life such as almost being trapped under the pool, getting hit by a log-booby trap, and getting chased by a dog. 
DEATH – In Episode 12, Trish is being chased by Wakefield and runs into Henry. After Henry reveals that he is Wakefield's accomplice, she tries to flee but he grabs her. Distraught, she ineffectually attacks him and he stabs her in the side. She gasps, and dies in her fiancé's arms, wearing her wedding gown. 
Appearances: Episodes 1–13

Killed by Henry Dunn.

Chloe Carter
(Portrayed by Cameron Richardson)
Chloe Carter is one of Trish's bridesmaids and Cal's girlfriend. She is sexy, flirty, impulsive, and always looking for ways to live life to the fullest, and has a surprising curiosity for serial killers, including John Wakefield. She very beautiful, but also intelligent and crafty, which is seen after she tricks the man who found (and refuses to give back) Cal's supposed engagement ring for her. At first her relationship with her boyfriend Cal seems shallow; she's an outgoing flirt and has attracted the interest of both Sully and Marty. However, later events make it clear that Chloe's feelings for Cal are genuine, proving that behind her bombshell exterior lies a woman who is searching for romance and true love. She, along with Cal, Beth and Sully tries to leave the island but Cal convinces her to stay because Madison's life will be at stake if they leave. Chloe gets abducted by Wakefield in episode 11, but Cal rescues her and proposes marriage, and she accepts.
 DEATH – In Episode 11, mere moments after getting engaged, Cal and Chloe find themselves trapped by Wakefield at a dead end in the middle of a bridge. Cal tries to hold Wakefield off so Chloe can try to climb to safety, but is stabbed and thrown into the river below. Rather than try to get away, she denies Wakefield the chance to kill her and instead lets herself fall from the bridge, telling him, "You can't have me."
Appearances: Episodes 1–4, 6, 8–11, 13

Committed suicide.

Cal Vandeusen
(Portrayed by Adam Campbell)
Cal Vandeusen is a doctor and Chloe's boyfriend. He is a charming British outsider who doesn't know anyone in the wedding party, but tries to fit in with the tight knit groups. He treats Chloe like gold, and bought an engagement ring for her before entering Harper's Island. Apparently, Cal is liked by everyone except Sully, who envies him for having Chloe despite his geeky and preppy demeanor. Cal seems to get cold feet whenever he plans to propose to Chloe, who is only waiting for him to do so. In Episode 10, the ring is given to Chloe before Cal leaves her to search for a boat he rented. He is then shot in the shoulder and is in critical condition, relying on Sully to operate. Miraculously, Sully manages to save Cal, and they both go after Wakefield to save Chloe.
 DEATH – In Episode 11, after finding, rescuing and proposing to Chloe, Cal finds they have been cornered on the bridge by Wakefield. While trying to hold Wakefield off so Chloe can escape, Cal is stabbed in the chest; his body is thrown off the bridge and into the river below. His last word was "Chloe".
Appearances: Episodes 1–4, 6, 8–11, 13

Killed by John Wakefield.

Jimmy Mance
(Portrayed by C.J. Thomason)
Jimmy Mance is a local fisherman and Abby's high school sweetheart. He's happy for the Wellington-Dunn wedding coming to Harper's Island because it brings Abby back to the island. He is also good friends with Henry. After the massacre that caused Abby to move out of the island years ago, Jimmy felt regret for not telling Abby how much he loves her. It was later revealed that when Abby saw her mother get killed by Wakefield, it was Jimmy who distracted him so that Abby could get away. Abby and Jimmy rekindle their relationship shortly before the wedding guests are supposed to be sent home. In Episode 10, Jimmy is almost killed when the docks explode, but is spared because of Sheriff Mills' agreement with Wakefield to trade his life for Jimmy's, and is again spared during the Cannery massacre. These events, along with a file on him in the Sheriff's attic, cause most of the survivors to suspect him of helping Wakefield, but Abby defends him. In the series finale, Henry fakes Jimmy's death along with his own and Abby's, and tries to force him to sign a confession by threatening Abby. He tackles Henry off a cliff to protect Abby, but sustains only minor injuries. Jimmy, along with Abby, Shea and Madison, escapes the island.

SURVIVAL – Jimmy, along with Abby, gets rescued by coast guards and taken to the mainland.
Appearances: Episodes 1–2, 4–5, 7–13

Sheriff Charlie Mills
(Portrayed by Jim Beaver)
Sheriff Mills is the local sheriff of Harper's Island and Abby's father. He supposedly killed John Wakefield seven years ago, but not before John Wakefield murdered his wife, Sarah. Sheriff Mills sent Abby away, and now that she's back for the wedding on Harper's Island, he hopes to reconcile with her. But times have changed, and Sheriff Mills has some dark secrets he has no intention of sharing with his daughter. Sheriff Mills appeared on the 6th episode of Harper's Globe.
 DEATH – In Episode 10, Sheriff Mills is bound with his hands behind his back and a noose around his neck, connected to his truck. As he and Abby have their final words, the Sheriff tells Abby that he made an agreement with Wakefield to spare Jimmy's life in exchange for his. He is then yanked backwards through the window by John Wakefield driving the truck, snapping his neck and hanging him.
Appearances: Episodes 1–3, 5–11, 13 (flashback)

Killed by John Wakefield.

Thomas Wellington
(Portrayed by Richard Burgi)
Thomas Wellington is Trish and Shea's father. He's also Katherine's husband. He's a conservative real estate mogul. He only wants the best for his daughter; but as far as he's concerned that doesn't involve marrying Henry Dunn. Wellington is accustomed to getting his way, and plans on stopping this wedding at all costs. He's also the only character that would have ever suspected Henry as the killer; in Episode 5, "Thwack", he admitted that he didn't trust Henry based on "gut instinct".
DEATH – In Episode 5, during the wedding rehearsal, Maggie tells Wellington to step up as if to light the unity candle, and then asks for someone to turn off the lights. When Abby flicks the switch it also triggers a mechanism that releases a headspade hidden in chandelier, causing it to fall on Thomas' head and split it in two down to the neck. His death makes everyone realize what is going on in the island. In Episode 12, Trish learns (before her death) that Henry killed her father.
KILLS – Cole Harkin's vicious dog, after it attacked him and Trish.
Appearances: Episodes 1–5

Killed by Henry Dunn.

J.D. Dunn
(Portrayed by Dean Chekvala)
J.D. Dunn is Henry's adoptive brother. He's a dark and brooding loner with tattoos all over his body that speak more to his true nature than he ever lets on in conversation. Being the only brother of the groom should have made him a lock for “best man,” but J.D.’s barely a guest at the wedding and wouldn’t mind just missing it all together. His childish antics make Henry’s life more difficult, and sometimes there’s a malevolence in them that makes everyone wonder if J.D. has some secret endgame. He relates to a local girl named Kelly and has sex with her before her death. He also has a huge conflict with Shane that almost killed him. He's arrested as a murder suspect in Episode 8, and tells the Sheriff where to find Cole Harkin, who he was helping track the copycat killer. He escapes later the same episode when the police station is attacked.
DEATH – In the end of Episode 8, J.D. is found by Abby hidden behind some barrels on the docks, bleeding profusely from an abdominal wound. Abby asks him who did this to him, but J.D. can only say that the murders are "all about you" before he dies. In the next episode, his body is taken to the clinic by Jimmy and Henry. It's revealed in the finale that Henry killed him on the docks, and that Abby almost caught him in the act. In Episode 13, Sully learns (before his death) that Henry killed JD and others.
Appearances: Episodes 1–3, 5–9, 10 (picture)

Killed by Henry Dunn.

Christopher "Sully" Sullivan
(Portrayed by Matt Barr)
Chris is Henry's best man. All of his friends call him "Sully". He's a fun-loving frat boy at heart whose good buddies live vicariously through his many sexual escapades. He's been Henry's best male friend since middle school. It's questionable if he's at the wedding more for Henry's benefit or for the bachelor party and bridesmaids, particularly when he gets an eyeful of Chloe. He is referred as the "team player" of his gang (consisting of him, Danny, Malcolm, Booth, and occasionally Abby and Beth). He attempts to attract Chloe into being with him instead of being with Cal, even forcing Cal to switch teams with him. He unintentionally forgets to save Cal in Episode 2, who gets caught in a rope trap. Cal, along with Chloe, then takes revenge on Sully by throwing feathers on his honey-coated body (he was at the spa), which was so humiliating that even his own gang laughed at the joke. Although he initially wants to leave immediately despite the threat to Madison's life, in Episode 10, he volunteers to go with Cal to find a sailboat so everyone can escape the island, and when Cal is shot in the process, he takes him to the clinic and, under Cal's direction, manages to remove the bullet and save Cal's life. The two form an unlikely friendship, and Sully realizes how much Cal and Chloe love each other. He later teams with Danny in an effort to save Chloe, and ambushes and shoots Wakefield while Danny acts as bait, but the others choose not to kill Wakefield. Sully says that it is a "big mistake". When Trish finds a boathouse, Sully stays in the boathouse to man the radio, and puts Shea and Madison on a small boat after Wakefield's escape, but chooses to stay behind to help his friends. He later goes with Henry to look for Trish, intending to find her and the others before heading to the marina to meet the Coast Guard.
DEATH – In Episode 13, Sully is searching for Trish with Henry when Henry starts to act suspicious. When Henry admits to killing Trish and JD, Sully at first thinks it's a sick joke but soon catches on. Still, he can't bring himself to shoot Henry, even as he lists whom he killed, until he laughs about killing Malcolm. Sully attempts to shoot him, but Henry reveals he unloaded the gun, and then flips the gun around to hit Henry. Henry then tells him that John Wakefield is behind him. Sully asks Henry how stupid he thinks he is, and Wakefield replies, "Pretty stupid." Henry stabs the distracted Sully in the back, fatally wounding him, but before he dies Henry tells him, "You never should've dogged Trish," referring to an earlier episode where Sully admitted to trying to sleep with Trish when she and Henry were broken up in college.
Appearances – Episodes 1–13

Killed by Henry Dunn.

Marty Dunn
(Portrayed by Harry Hamlin)
Uncle Marty is a surrogate father to Henry – the only family besides J.D. that he has at the wedding. Uncle Marty loves being the center of attention; he started partying sometime in the 1970s and just never stopped. But behind his blithe demeanor is someone who cares deeply for Henry and would do anything to protect him. And behind that is a guy who pops pills when no one is looking while toting around a bag stuffed with bundles of cash and a gun. In "Sigh," Henry reveals that Marty wanted to use the money to invest in Malcolm's brewery.
DEATH – In the pilot episode, Marty walks over a footbridge when a few floorboards give way and he falls halfway, becoming stuck. He then hears someone under him and asks them to help. The sound of slicing is heard and Marty attempts to shoot through the bridge, but fails to hit his attacker and is cut in half.
Appearances: Episode 1

Killed by John Wakefield.

Hunter Jennings
(Portrayed by Victor Webster)
Hunter Jennings was Trish's ex-boyfriend from college. He's from a family as affluent as the Wellingtons. He's exciting and passionate. He's also selfish and unreliable, which is why Trish broke up with him. But now that she's getting married, Hunter has shown up (hired by Mr. Wellington) on the island even though he's not invited, hoping to convince Trish that he's the one she should be marrying. A deleted scene on the series DVD has Katherine showing Thomas a file on Hunter, revealing the man has been disowned from his family for his thieving ways, making Thomas realize he may not be a good match for Trish after all.
DEATH – In Episode 3, Hunter is headed off to the mainland with a bag of money that's revealed to be Uncle Marty's in Episode 13. Soon, the boat stops and Hunter struggles to open the base of the boat, with a shotgun attached and triggered to shoot him. The shotgun shoots his face off and his body is found in Episode 4 by the groomsmen. It's revealed in Episode 13 that Henry killed Hunter Jennings.
Appearances: Episodes 1–3

Killed by Henry Dunn.

Shea Allen
(Portrayed by Gina Holden)
Shea Allen is Trish's big sister and the Maid of Honor. From the outside, she appears to have it all – a great husband, a beautiful daughter, and all the money in the world. But nothing is as it seems. There are problems in her marriage and her daughter Madison is acting out. Trish later reveals that she found her husband cheating on her with Katherine. The stress of keeping up appearances has Shea trapped in a life that may seem like every woman's dream, but she never really wanted for herself. With the exception of a few locals, Shea and her daughter, along with Abby and Jimmy, are the only survivors of the Harper's Island murders.

SURVIVAL – Shea and her daughter escape the island on a small motor boat, leaving the others behind. Although Shea wants to stay so she could help, Sully manages to convince her by telling her that her main priority had to be keeping Madison safe.

Appearances – Episodes 1–13

Richard Allen
(Portrayed by David Lewis)
Richard is Shea's husband, a guy who married into the Wellington family and business and lives every day with that fact hanging over his head. Henry sees Richard as an example of what not to become – a meek subordinate who has completely broken under the thumb of Mr. Wellington. It is implied that he worked for Mr. Wellington before he met Shea, and won his favor by being successful and making sure that his wife and daughter are happy. Richard keeps his severe contempt for Mr. Wellington under wraps, but is already in the process of taking revenge on the man who has made his life so miserable. Despite of his fault, he still insists that he loves Shea, and that his affair is just to humiliate Mr. Wellington. In Episode 3, it's revealed that he was having an affair with Katherine Wellington. Trish sees him with Katherine and reveals their betrayal to her father during an argument, but Mr. Wellington decides to do nothing until after Trish's wedding.
DEATH – In Episode 6, Richard is impaled by a harpoon and pulled out of sight. Henry, Abby and Katherine find his corpse tied to a tree in Episode 8, with the harpoon still in him. In the final episode, Henry tells Sully he harpooned Richard. The final thing he said was "...Madison."
Appearances: Episodes 1–6, 8

Killed by Henry Dunn.

Madison Allen
(Portrayed by Cassandra Sawtell)
Madison is Shea and Richard's daughter. She's cute, sweet, and sometimes, horribly spooky. Many kids enjoy mischief but Madison might enjoy it a little too much. She has a tendency to say things that indicate she has a better idea about what's happening on Harper's Island than the adults do. Madison was kidnapped by Wakefield through episodes 8 and 9, though she tells Abby that it was the Sheriff who abducted her. In episode 10 she tells Trish that she lied, claiming that Wakefield told her that if she didn't, her mother would "disappear" like her father. It is also Madison who reveals that Wakefield is not working alone. Madison later tells her mother and Trish that she first met Wakefield, her "new friend", the day they arrived on the island. Both Madison & her mother survived the series and left the island.

SURVIVAL – Madison escaped with her mother on a boat in episode 13 with the help of Christopher 'Sully' Sullivan. Later on, they are both at the police station. Madison gets sent off with Agent Perez so that Shea and the other Agent can talk privately. Just as Madison goes out of the room, she says "He's going to tell you everyone else is dead, isn't he?"

Appearances – Episodes 1–13

Katherine Wellington
(Portrayed by Claudette Mink)
Katherine is the very definition of a trophy wife; a woman closer in age to her stepdaughters than her husband. Trish used to resent her, but Shea had always tolerated her because she makes their dad happy. But considering Katherine's secret dark desires, that might not be for long. In Episode 3, it's revealed that she was having an affair with Richard Allen. Still, Katherine seem to genuinely care for her step-family and tells them that what she did is not meant to hurt anyone, because she does love her husband. According to producers, a subplot was meant to be included that Thomas had lost all his money through a bad business deal and that it was Katherine who was paying for the entire wedding, but she allowed Thomas to pretend he was doing it so he did not lose face in front of his daughters. The storyline was dropped due to time constraints.
DEATH – In the end of Episode 9, Shane tells Katherine (who he thought was alive) that the group had found Madison, and then notices the blood seeping through the sheets on the chair. It is then revealed that she was stabbed in the back with pruning shears. In Episode 10, Shane shows Henry Katherine's corpse and tells him that she was still warm when he checks for a pulse, meaning that she was killed very recently. In the final episode, it's revealed that Henry killed Katherine while everyone was running around looking for Madison.
Appearances: Episodes 1–6, 8–10

Killed by Henry Dunn.

Danny Brooks
(Portrayed by Brandon Jay McLaren)
Danny is a groomsman and one of Henry's best friends from college. He's the sensitive guy in the group. He's thoughtful and always wants to do the right thing. Danny feels things deeply, and when he senses injustice, he can't walk away, but has to try to make things right. He is mainly the closest friend of Sully, but is still close to Malcolm and Booth, and likes Cal. He is kind enough to attract many friends, which Sully envies. In Episode 12, he acts as bait for Wakefield so Sully can ambush and shoot him. Wakefield even admits that he put up a good fight, and that he did not embarrass himself.

DEATH – In Episode 12, Danny attempts to fight Wakefield so that Shea and Madison can escape the town jail. Although he puts up a good fight, Wakefield manages to grab him and impale him through the right eye with a memo holder.

Appearances: Episodes 1–13

Killed by John Wakefield.

Malcolm Ross
(Portrayed by Chris Gauthier)
Malcolm Ross is a groomsman. He's a big, boisterous guy who not only brings his own beer to a party, but he brews it himself. Malcolm is trying to start up a business to mass-produce his microbrew, Sacred Turtle. Even though his friends are very supportive emotionally, he lacks the funds to finance his endeavor. His inability to raise capital has put a great deal of stress on Malcolm, and made him desperate enough to do things his friends would never suspect. When their group decides to make Booth hide the money, he follows him to convince to take it with them, but Booth accidentally shoots his leg. Malcolm tries to save Booth but after his death, he buries him, takes the money and does not tell his friends what happened. Among his friends, Booth is the one he is closest to.
DEATH – In Episode 7, Malcolm is burning money when he is yanked away and hacked to bits; his limbs and head are then thrown into a furnace (in a deleted scene that was considered "not suitable for television"). Cal later finds his skull in Episode 8, but doesn't know who the skull belongs to, though he reassures everyone it isn't Madisons'. 
Appearances: Episodes 1–7, 13

Killed by Henry Dunn.

Joel Booth
(Portrayed by Sean Rogerson)
Joel is a groomsman. Everyone calls him by his surname, Booth. He's a loyal friend who lacks some of the social graces of the other groomsmen. His hypochondria amuses his friends to no end, particularly his sea-sickness. He can be very jumpy and panicky, although his decisions are usually for the best. When the groomsmen found Uncle Marty's money, they decided to hide it until they can bring it to the police after the wedding. Unable to decide who would hide it, they had a draw, resulting Booth as the one tasked to hide the bag. Malcolm follows him and he shoots his own leg. As Malcolm tries to call for help, Booth begs not to be left alone, and eventually dies on Malcolm's hands.
DEATH – In Episode 4, Booth dies after accidentally shooting himself with Uncle Marty's gun in the leg and subsequently bleeding to death.
Appearances: Episodes 1–4, 13

Killed by himself (accidental death).

Beth Barrington
(Portrayed by Amber Borycki)
Beth Barrington is a bridesmaid and Trish's former college roommate. She's beautiful, energetic and athletic. Though she didn't grow up as privileged as Trish, she's very comfortable in that world. She reveals to Shea that Trish slept with Hunter back in college, but Trish makes it clear that she now belongs to Henry. She also said she wants to find love with as good a man as Henry. She develops a quick friendship with Malcolm throughout episodes 6 and 7 (and a deleted scene in episode 2) after Malcolm comforts a traumatized Beth who is getting paranoid because of the deaths.
DEATH – In Episode 9, after a long search of a tunnel system sparked by a trail of blood and Beth missing, Beth's body is discovered by Danny; her body had been cut in half by Wakefield. Her top half and right arm was shown, but the bottom half and left arm was never found or shown.
Appearances: Episodes 1–9

Killed by John Wakefield.

Lucy Daramour
(Portrayed by Sarah Smyth)
Lucy is a bridesmaid and one of Trish's childhood friends. Their families traveled and summered together. Though Lucy is more of a socialite than the other bridesmaids, she's trying to find her own way in the world by attending law school. Lucy is always carrying her handbag dog, Gigi, which causes her a minor conflict with Nikki. She also has a boyfriend named Ryan.
DEATH – In Episode 2, Lucy falls into a covered ditch. Wakefield then pours lighter fluid on her, drops a lit match, and burns her to death. The matchbox is from the Candlewick Inn.
Appearances: Episodes 1–2

Killed by John Wakefield.

Shane Pierce
(Portrayed by Ben Cotton)
Shane is a local fisherman who pretty much dislikes everyone.  He works on a boat with his best friend, Jimmy Mance, and hates that the return of Abby Mills has turned Jimmy into her little whipping boy.  He has a particular distaste for Henry Dunn's brother, J.D., especially after J.D. starts flirting with his ex-girlfriend, Kelly. Shane's got a short temper and a history of violence, which makes him capable of just about anything.  When Kelly dies, he believes that it is JD's fault and he kidnaps him, planning to kill him by hanging. Abby rescues JD telling Shane that she believes Kelly's statement that John Wakefield is alive and most likely killed her. Shane reveals that he is blaming himself for Kelly's death. When he goes to prison, and JD is brought in to the next cell, Wakefield kills the deputy. JD escapes but leaves Shane alone. Shane only got out after he promises to tell Abby where the Sheriff went.
DEATH – In Episode 11, Shane attempts to fight Wakefield with a pocket knife, covering the girls' escape through the Cannery bathroom. Although he is quick, nearly getting Wakefield once and dodging his first attack, Wakefield is quicker. He cuts Shane's arm when he tries to attack again, and his hand. Continuing to fight through an arm wound and a subsequent stomach wound, Shane is eventually run through and left for dead. However, when Wakefield goes after the girls and corners Trish, Shane returns and distracts him long enough for her to escape. When Henry, Danny and Abby return, they find his body tied to an oar by his arms and hanging from the Cannery ceiling as though crucified.
Appearances: Episodes 1–3, 8–11

Killed by John Wakefield.

Kelly Seaver
(Portrayed by Anna Mae Routledge)
Kelly has a unique connection with Abby: both of their mothers were killed by John Wakefield. But when Abby left the island, Kelly stayed behind and has never gotten over her mother's murder. She's struggled with depression and suicide attempts and a secret belief that John Wakefield is still alive and coming back for her. Kelly used to date Shane, who is very bitter over their break-up. Kelly also finds companionship with JD which only worsens the rivalry between the two boys. When Kelly expresses her desire to finally leave the island and go to LA, Abby hesitates in allowing her to stay with her, but Abby eventually tells her that she can be her roommate until she gets her own place. An ecstatic Kelly shares this news with JD and has sex with him, but ends up dead the next day.
DEATH – In Episode 2, Kelly is found hanged in her home by Wakefield, her eyes filled with red ink. Also, her neck appears to be snapped.
Appearances: Episodes 1–3

Killed by John Wakefield.

Nikki Bolton
(Portrayed by Ali Liebert)
Nikki is an old friend of Abby's and a local who lives on the island and manages The Cannery, a bar on the island. She's a tough, sexy, straight-talking local who doesn't back down from confrontation. She's thrilled Abby's back on the island, and looks forward to having fun while the wedding party's in town. She seems to be Abby's confidant and best girl friend, helping her with her potential relationship with Jimmy. As Abby returns, Nikki is the one who updates her with what is going on in the island. A good friend of Kelly's, she is the one to find her body, but is otherwise nearly completely excluded from major events. She manages to walk into the Cannery unimpeded, which convinces Maggie the killer isn't after locals, and gives the others her keys so Sully and Cal can use her car to go get the sailboat. Nikki shares a kiss with Sully before he leaves with Cal, but any potential relationship ends with her death at Wakefield's hands.
DEATH – In episode 11, Nikki is the first to react when Wakefield breaks into the Cannery, immediately going for the gun behind the bar. She tries to shoot him, but he grabs the barrel and holds it up while he stabs her through the stomach with his boarding knife, and then drags her over the counter.
Appearances: Episodes 1–4, 6–7, 10–11

Killed by John Wakefield.

Maggie Krell
(Portrayed by Beverly Elliott)
Maggie is the energetic manager of The Candlewick Inn. She knew Abby, Henry, and Trish when they were kids and couldn't be happier to have them all back... especially for such a special occasion. She's meticulously planned the week's events and has more than just a few surprises in store for the wedding party. Maggie appeared in the 7th episode of Harper's Globe.
DEATH – In Episode 10, Maggie abandoned the survivors, believing herself to be safe because she's a local. Later, after Madison hears noises on the roof, Maggie's hung body appears (put there by Wakefield), dangling at the window of The Cannery to frighten the others. Subsequently, her body can be seen hanging when the Cannery is shown in wide shots in Episodes 10 and 11.
Appearances: Episodes 1–2, 4–6, 8–10

Killed by John Wakefield.

Other characters

Doctor Ike Campbell
(Portrayed by Jay Brazeau)
In Episode 3, Doctor Campbell carries out a post-mortem on Kelly Seaver, attempting to determine whether she committed suicide or was murdered. He also investigates the deaths of Reverend Fain and Thomas Wellington, remarking about how similar they are to the Wakefield killings. Sheriff Mills reminds him that John Wakefield is dead, but Doctor Campbell replies that someone is doing, "one hell of a job imitating him." He reminds Sheriff Mills that the head spade, used in several killings, was Wakefield's signature weapon. It is possible the Doctor survived the Wakefield-Dunn killing spree, though his fate is not revealed on-screen; he may be among the "handful of locals" referred to by FBI Agent Hanson as having survived the killings.
Appearances: Episodes 3, 6–7

Officer Tyra Coulter
(portrayed by Julia Anderson)
Washington State Patrol officer arriving to Harper's Island to apprehend J.D. She's new to the force and is excited to apprehend her first murderer.
DEATH – In Episode 10, when she and Darryl exit the plane and get ready to step onto the dock, John Wakefield in a sheriff's uniform walks up to them and shoots them. They are later found by Shane before the explosion at the marina.
Appearances: Episode 10

Killed by John Wakefield, disguised as the sheriff.

Gigi Daramour
(Portrayed by 'Lily')
Gigi is Lucy's handbag dog. According to Lucy, Gigi is people. In episode 2, Gigi ran off while everyone is having a picnic, Gigi was barking when Lucy fell into the trap pit. Gigi was then found by Cole Harkin and was one of his "pets". Gigi was rarely seen since then. Trish and her father saw Gigi and followed her farther into the woods. Gigi is one of the survivors of Harper's Island.
Appearances: Episodes 1–2, 4–6, 8

Reverend Fain
(Portrayed by Terrence Kelly)
DEATH – In Episode 2, Reverend Fain, who was supposed to officiate at Henry and Trish's wedding, gets caught in a trap and then decapitated. Henry happily admits to decapitating Reverend Fain in the final episode.
Appearances: Episode 2

Killed by Henry Dunn.

Karena Fox
(Portrayed by Chilton Crane)
 Karena Fox is a middle-aged woman who works as a psychic on Harper's Island. She also maintains a blog on Harper's Globe. In Episode 4, Karena was hired by Shea to perform psychic readings at the bachelorette party. She also let Madison borrow her tarot card The Tower. That night, she prophesied that a man would betray Trish, but also be her savior (Richard Allen). She then tried to read Abby's future, but had a disturbing vision and left. She later found Abby and warned her, "He won't stop; he wants you dead!" It is assumed she was talking about Wakefield. It is possible Karena survived the Wakefield-Dunn killing spree, though her fate is not revealed on-screen; she may be among the "handful of locals" referred to by FBI Agent Hanson as having survived the killings.
Appearances: Episode 4

Deputy Garrett
(Portrayed by Aaron Pearl)
The deputy helps with investigating the murders on the island. He's also the jail guard at the police station.
DEATH – He dies in Episode 8 after being shot in the town jail by Wakefield.
Appearances: Episodes 7–8, 12

Killed by John Wakefield.

Cole Harkin
(Portrayed by Dean Wray)
 Cole Harkin was one of the two officers attacked by John Wakefield during his first rampage. He was caught in a boat explosion that burned his face and the entire right side of his body. He was sent to Seattle for treatment and returned to the island months later. He forms a friendship with J.D., helping to prove his innocence. He rescues the Sheriff when he gets wounded from a trap.
DEATH – Cole Harkin was shot with an arrow by Wakefield, pinning him to the cabin. He dropped his lantern and the diary, starting a fire. As he tried to free himself, he was shot and killed with a second arrow, which was also shot by Wakefield. His body is burned as the fire his lantern started spreads.
Appearances: Episodes 5–8

Killed by John Wakefield.

Deputy Patrick Lillis
(Portrayed by Nicholas Carella)
Deputy Lillis is one of Sheriff Mills' deputies and is the nephew of the Sheriff's best man at Sheriff's wedding. Deputy Patrick Lillis joined Sheriff Mills to investigate Nikki Bolton's call about Kelly's suicide. He later was sent to investigate the disappearance of Reverend Fain. He found the Reverend's hearing-aid in the woods, before he and Sheriff Mills discovered his dismembered body in the swamp. He also joined the other deputies in tracking J.D. in the woods.
DEATH – In Episode 11, his body is discovered in a church pew, his throat slit open.
Appearances: Episodes 2, 5–7, 11

Killed by John Wakefield.

Robin Matthews
(Portrayed by Melanie Merkosky)
In Episode 4, Robin meets Abby Mills and gives her an article about Henry. She also has a stack of newspapers on the Wakefield murders, but she tells Abby the person who ordered them never came to pick them up. Robin escapes from Harper's Island.
Robin is also the main character of the online series, Harper's Globe.
SURVIVAL – Robin fakes her death, and escapes the island from Henry and Wakefield.
Appearances: Episode 4

Sarah Mills
(Portrayed by Sarah-Jane Redmond)
Sarah Mills, wife of Sheriff Charlie Mills and mother of Abby Mills and Henry Dunn, was the fifth victim of John Wakefield in the 2001 murders. Sarah is killed prior to the pilot, and is cited as the main reason for the original Wakefield massacre. Sarah appeared in flashbacks that explained the events leading to her death. Her children are the main characters of the series. Prior to the pilot, Sarah, along with Kelly Seaver's mom, Kate Seaver, and Christopher Cullen, are hung in the Tree of Woe by John Wakefield.
Appearances: Episodes 7, 13 (In flashbacks). The character also appears in other episodes where she is shown (again in flashback) hung from the Tree of Woe.

Julia Mitchell
(Portrayed by Maxine Miller)
In episode 4, Julia gets a lift into town with Jimmy. She's also there to witness Thomas' murder at the wedding rehearsal. She maintains a blog on Harper's Globe, thanks to the help of her grandson, Timmy. It is possible Julia survived the Wakefield-Dunn killing spree, though her fate is not revealed on-screen; she may be among the "handful of locals" referred to by FBI Agent Hanson as having survived the killings.
Appearances: Episodes 4–6

Officer Darryl Riggens
(Portrayed by Michael Rogers)
Washington State Patrol officer arriving to Harper's Island to apprehend J.D. He's been a state police officer for a while, and is no longer thrilled by apprehending criminals.
DEATH – In Episode 10, when he and Tyra exit the plane and get ready to step onto the dock, John Wakefield in a sheriff's uniform walks up to them and shoots them. They are later found by Shane before the explosion at the marina.
Appearances: Episode 10

Killed by John Wakefield, disguised as the Sheriff.

John Wakefield
(Portrayed by Callum Keith Rennie)
John Wakefield was the perpetrator of a killing spree in 2001 on Harper's Island and the series' main antagonist. He originally killed six and wounded five in various locations on the island. The victims were hacked with a head-spade, burned in the Marina explosion or hanged from the Tree of Woe. The surviving victims all sustained severe burns.
Wakefield grew up in Tacoma, Washington. He was a fisherman that frequented the waters off of Alaska and Washington.

Wakefield came to Harper's Island in the 1980s after tracking down his ex-girlfriend Sarah Mills who had fled from him because he was abusive. After trying to get her to leave with him Sarah's boyfriend Sheriff Charlie Mills had several of his Deputies try to get him to leave by scaring him. He attacked one of the men, Cole Harkin and cut him pretty badly. He was arrested for one count of attempted murder of a police officer and was given a life sentence. He was held at a maximum security prison in upstate Washington. Wakefield was released in 2001 for "good behavior", after completing only 17 years of his sentence. Wakefield soon returned to Harper's Island, where he went on a murderous rampage.

After the murders, it's believed that Sheriff Charlie Mills shot and killed Wakefield, but recent photographs that match up almost identically to Wakefield's figure suggest otherwise. In Episode 10, John Wakefield is revealed to be alive and on the island and he also kills Maggie Krell and Sheriff Mills and tells Abby that she "looks just like her mother". In Episode 11, he goes to the Cannery and kills Nikki and Shane. He later takes Chloe hostage and after Cal found her, he kills Cal by stabbing him, leading Chloe to kill herself.

Wakefield's motives remain unclear throughout most of the series. While many townsfolk remember Wakefield as wanting to get revenge on the Sheriff for wrongfully imprisoning him, it's revealed that he had a romantic relationship with Abby's mother, and when Chloe asks, Wakefield states that he "almost died for a woman" like her. Wakefield's wrath is fueled by the fact that Sarah gave up their son Henry for adoption, but kept Abby. Wakefield is familiar with the weapons the survivors are carrying, and, knowing they contain very limited ammunition, gives his victims a chance to shoot him as a long-range stationary target before either retreating or killing them. In Episode 12, it's revealed that Wakefield is Henry's biological father.  Wakefield appears in Episodes 5–6 of Harper's Globe.
DEATH – In Episode 13, Abby is stuck in the middle of a stand-off between her, Henry and Wakefield. Wakefield believes Henry will finish her off, but is betrayed by his son as he gets stabbed instead.
KILLS – Marty Dunn, Kelly Seaver, Lucy Daramour, Deputy Garrett, Cole Harkin, Beth Barrington, Officer Riggens, Officer Coulter, Maggie Krell, Sheriff Charlie Mills, Nikki Bolton, Shane Pierce, Deputy Lillis, Cal Vandeusen, Danny Brooks.
Appearances: Episodes 10–13

Killed by Henry Dunn.

Ben Wellington
(Portrayed by Clint Carleton)
First appeared, to the dismay of Robin Matthews, in the 4th episode of Harper's Globe.
DEATH – He was next seen in the pilot episode of Harper's Island, tied to the bottom of the boat by Henry, and was dismembered by the propeller upon cast off.
Appearances: Episode 1

Killed by Henry Dunn.

References

Lists of minor fictional characters
Lists of drama television characters
Lists of American television series characters